The 1st Fighter Regiment (1. ловачки пук) was an aviation regiment established in 1945 as part of the Yugoslav Air Force. The regiment was stationed at Zadar Airport until it was disbanded in the same year.

History
The 1st Fighter Regiment was formed on 18 May 1945 at Zadar Airport. It was composed of aircraft and personnel from two former RAF squadrons, No. 352 and No. 351 which had been operated by Yugoslav personnel and equipped with British-made Hawker Hurricane Mk IV and Supermarine Spitfire Mk VC and IX fighter aircraft. The regiment was short-lived, and had been disbanded by the end of August 1945. Its personnel were sent to Sombor to contribute to the formation of the 4th Aviation Bomber Division and some equipment was transferred to Mostar airport.

Commanding officers

Aircraft
Hawker Hurricane IV
Supermarine Spitfire VC
Supermarine Spitfire IX

References

Fighter regiments of the Yugoslav Air Force
Military units and formations established in 1945
Military units and formations disestablished in 1945